Lawrence Costa (1969/1970 – 17 December 2022) was an Australian politician. He was a Labor member of the Northern Territory Legislative Assembly from 2016 until his death in 2022, representing the electorate of Arafura. He was of Tiwi descent.

Early life and career
Costa lived on his homeland Pitjarmirra north of Melville Island.

Costa worked for the Pirlangimpi Community Government Council running the then CDEP Program from 1996 to 2002. He was elected on Jabiru Regional Council as the Deputy Chairman. He was then elected chairperson of North West Regional Council from 2002 to 2005. He then became CEO of Tiwi Islands Local Government in 2008. After the amalgamations of the shires he became director of Community Development with Tiwi Islands Shire Council until 2013. Before entering politics, Costa worked as a health service development officer for the Department of Health.

Politics

|}

Costa was elected into the Northern Territory Legislative Assembly in 2016 for the Labor Party in the electoral division of Arafura, defeating Francis Xavier Kurrupuwu.

Personal life and death
Costa died suddenly on 17 December 2022, at the age of 52.

References

20th-century births
Year of birth missing
2022 deaths
Members of the Northern Territory Legislative Assembly
Australian Labor Party members of the Northern Territory Legislative Assembly
Indigenous Australian politicians
21st-century Australian politicians
Tiwi Islands people